Leanne Pompeani (born 25 June 1996) is an Australian long-distance runner. She competed in the senior women's race at the 2019 IAAF World Cross Country Championships held in Aarhus, Denmark. She finished in 45th place.

In 2022, she won the City2Surf and Burnie Ten road races.

References

External links 
 

Living people
1996 births
Place of birth missing (living people)
Australian female long-distance runners
Australian female cross country runners
20th-century Australian women
21st-century Australian women